Rodolphe Boudreau,  (September 19, 1865 – 1923) was a Canadian civil servant. He was the Clerk of the Privy Council, the senior civil servant in the government and the Secretary to the Canadian Cabinet, from 1907 to 1923.

Born in St. Gregoire, Quebec, the son of J. B. Boudreau and Sarah Fortier, Boudreau was educated at Nicolet College and Laval University. He entered the civil service in 1896 and was Private Secretary to Wilfrid Laurier from 1889 to 1907. In 1900, he was appointed Assistant Clerk of the Privy Council and became Clerk of the Privy Council in 1907. He served as Clerk until his death in 1923.

He was named Companion of the Order of St Michael and St George in 1918.

References
 

1865 births
1923 deaths
Clerks of the Privy Council (Canada)
Canadian Companions of the Order of St Michael and St George